Podluhy is a municipality and village in Beroun District in the Central Bohemian Region of the Czech Republic. It has about 700 inhabitants.

History
The first written mention of Podluhy is from 1331.

References

External links

Villages in the Beroun District